Antonio López Álvarez (born 12 May 1980 in Madrid) is a Spanish retired footballer who played as a left midfielder.

External links

1980 births
Living people
Footballers from Madrid
Spanish footballers
Association football midfielders
La Liga players
Segunda División players
Segunda División B players
CD Leganés B players
CD Leganés players
Real Valladolid players
CD Numancia players
Sevilla FC players
UEFA Cup winning players
Málaga CF players
CD Castellón footballers
Gimnàstic de Tarragona footballers
Albacete Balompié players
CD Teruel footballers
CF Fuenlabrada footballers